The economy of Kochi was worth 49453.29 crores in 2012 - 2013 financial year with a growth of almost 7.5% per annum.

Synopsis

The economy of Kochi can be classified as a business economy with emphasis on the service sector. Major business sectors include construction, manufacturing, shipbuilding, transportation/shipping, seafood and spices exports, chemical industries, information technology (IT), tourism, health services, and banking. The High Court of Kerala is situated in the city. Consequentially, legal services are a major contributor to the economy.
To tap the potential of the natural harbour at Kochi further, a marina and an international container transshipment terminal have been built. The city used to house Kerala's stock exchange, the Cochin Stock Exchange. Federal Bank, the fourth largest Private-sector bank in India, is headquartered at Aluva. As in most of Kerala, inward remittances from abroad by Non Resident Indians (NRI) is a major source of income. In the 2009 rankings of ease to start and operate a business, Kochi was ranked sixteenth, above Kolkata Exports and allied activities are also important contributors to the city's economy. Tourism has of late, become a major contributor to the city's income.
The Headquarters of the Southern Naval Command of the Indian Navy is situated at Venduruthy about 5 kilometers south of the city centre.
The state government has given priority to the establishment of IT and BPO enterprises to exploit the opportunities that have arisen in the field.

Major industries

Chemical industry
Eloor, situated 17 km north of the city, is an island of 11.21 km2 and is the largest industrial belt in Kerala. There are more than 247 industries viz. Fertilisers and Chemicals Travancore (FACT), Travancore Cochin Chemicals, Indian Rare Earths Limited, Hindustan Insecticides Limited and many others manufacturing a range of products like chemical-petrochemical products, pesticides, rare-earth elements, rubber processing chemicals, fertilizers, zinc/chromium compounds and leather products.

Ship building
The Cochin Shipyard in Kochi is one of the largest ship building facility in India. Cochin Shipyard was incorporated in the year 1972 as a fully owned Government of India company. In the last three decades the company has emerged as a forerunner in the Indian shipbuilding & Shiprepair industry. This yard can build and repair the largest vessels in India. CSL has secured shipbuilding orders from internationally renowned companies from Europe & Middle East and is nominated to build the country's first indigenously built Air Defence Ship. The Cochin Shipyard also builds ships for the Indian Navy.

Shipyard commenced ship repair operations in the year 1982 and has undertaken repairs of all types of ships including upgradation of ships of oil exploration industry as well as periodical lay up repairs and life extension of ships of Navy, UTL, Coast Guard, Fisheries and Port Trust besides merchant ships of SCI & ONGC. The yard has, over the years, developed adequate capabilities to handle complex and sophisticated repair jobs. Recently Cochin Shipyard won a major repair orders from ONGC. The order for major repairs of three rigs viz Mobile Offshore Drilling Unit (MODU) Sagar Vijay, Mobile Offshore Drilling Unit (MODU) Sagar Bhushan and Jack Up Rig (JUR) Sagar Kiran was secured by CSL against very stiff international competition.

Oil refining
Bharat Petroleum Corporation Limited Kochi Refinery.
Kochi also has an oil refinery – the Kochi Refineries Limited (KRL), in Ambalamugal. Formerly known as Cochin Refineries Ltd., was formally registered on 6 September 1963 at Ernakulam. Philips Petroleum International Corporation was the prime contractors for the construction of the refinery. They entrusted the work to Pacific Procon Limited. Construction work started in March 1964 and the first unit came on stream just after 29 months in September 1966.
In accordance with the decision of Govt. of India to sell its stake in Kochi Refineries Ltd., a stand-alone refinery with a capacity of 7.5 million tonnes per year, BPCL has acquired 54.81% shares held by Govt. of India (GOI) in Kochi Refineries Ltd. on 26.03.2001 for a total consideration of Rs. 6591 million.
Consequent to the merger Order dated 18 August 2006 issued by Ministry of Company Affairs, the refinery has been amalgamated with Bharat Petroleum Corporation, henceforth to be known as BPCL-Kochi Refinery.

Information technology
Kochi is the second biggest contributor to Kerala's IT Exports. Kochi is one of the leading Tier-II destination for IT and ITES companies in the country. The availability of 15 Gbit/s bandwidth, through undersea cables such as FLAG, SAFE and SEA ME WE 3 ensures seamless data flow, and lower operational costs compared to other major cities in India, has been to its advantage. The InfoPark promoted by the Government of Kerala is home to companies like TCS, Wipro, IBM , Iqvia, Suyati Technologies, Sayone Technologies, Deulect Technologies, QBurst, Ignitho Technologies,  Fragomen, Baker Hughes, Deloitte, Xerox, North Gate Arinso, Ernst & Young, UST Global, Suyati, Cognizant and Qurve Inc, IT exports from InfoPark alone are worth around 3200 crores. A larger technology campus, the SmartCity, Kochi, is under construction, the first phase of which is expected to open by March 2015.

Electronics hardware
Kochi has a well established electronics industry. V-Guard Industries, the market leader in voltage stabilizers, FCI OEN Connectors and SFO Technologies, the largest manufacturer of photonics devices in India are the largest operators in this field. The Government of Kerala has announced a project to build an industrial park named Electronic City spanning an area of 340 acres, to cater to the electronic hardware industries. The private operator NeST is building a Special Economic Zone specifically for electronics hardware spanning an area of 30 acres.

Retail

Kochi is a shopping hub for central Kerala. The higher GDP and per-capita income in the surrounding districts promote the retail business. The major retail ventures in Kochi are gold, textile, furniture, home accessories and home appliances. There are a number of textile stores that exceed  of retail space.. Emmanual Silks in Kochi is the world's largest textile showroom.

Kochi houses the highest number of shopping malls in the state of Kerala. Oberon Mall is the first full format mall in the state. Gold Souk Grande Kochi is a larger mall which is partially open for business. Abad Nucleus Mall & Baypride mall are fully open. Apart from these, the Lulu International Shopping Mall, Kochi, the largest shopping mall in India, is located in Edapally area of Kochi, Kerala. There are many more under construction, like Q1 Mall, Baani Mega Mall, Mall of joy, Central plaza, Unitech great India Place, Forum mall and RDS Rajagiri Mall. Kochi will also be home to India's 1st health mall, BCG Healthsquare (under construction).

Malls in Kochi
 Lulu International Mall
 Centre Square Mall
 Oberon Mall
 Gold Souq Grande
 Nucleus Mall
 Grand Mall
 Bay Pride Mall
U/C
 Forum Mall Kochi
 Forum Mall Kakkanad
 Asten Mall
 Q1 Mall

Spices and seafood
Kochi is home to the International Pepper Exchange, where black pepper is globally traded. The Spices Board of India is also headquartered at Kochi.
The Cochin fishing harbour, located at Thoppumpady is a major fishing port in the state and supplies fish to the local and export markets.
Central Government establishments like the Coconut Development Board, the Coir Board, the Marine Products Export Development Authority (MPEDA) and the Spices Board are also located in the city.
KUFOS (Kerala University of Fisheries and Ocean Studies) first university in India exclusively dedicated to studies in fisheries and allied disciplines is also located in the city.

Special economic zones 
There are four special economic zones (SEZs) in the city, Cochin Special Economic Zone, InfoPark and SmartCity in Kakkanad, and Puthuvype in Vypin. Electronic City is a proposed SEZ for electronic hardware manufacturing to be built in Kalamassery by NeST Infratech.

Governmental institutions
Union Government establishments like the Coconut Development Board, the Coir Board and the Marine Products Export Development Authority (MPEDA) have head offices located in the city.

Kochi is the seat of the High Court of Kerala, the highest court of Kerala and the Lakshadweep.

History

Prehistoric to Chera period 
Cochin was preceded by the Vempalinad fiefdom, which was part of the Kulasekhara empire.

Independent period 
Cochin became independent of the Kulasekhara empire in 1102 AD. It gained prominence as a trading port after the destruction of Muziris in 1341. It attracted Arab, Chinese and European maritime traders. Chinese fishing nets have been in use by the Cochinite fishing industry since 1350.

Portuguese period 
Portuguese traders built a factory in Cochin after obtaining permission from the Cochinite government in 1500. In return for defending Cochin against invasion by Calicut in 1503, Portugal was permitted to establish a military base in Cochin, and built Fort Emmanuel at the site of what is now Fort Kochi. Cochin became the capital of the newly formed Portuguese India, and the kingdom became a puppet state of Portugal.

Dutch period 
In 1662, the Dutch Republic launched an invasion of Cochin during a succession crisis, and completed it by February 1663. The Cochinite king, Rama Varma II (1658–1662) of the Tanur branch, was killed in battle, his successor Goda Varma was deposed, and the Dutch-backed pretender, Vīra Kērala Varma V of the Mutha Tavazhi branch, was installed as the new Raja of Cochin. The Portuguese traders and colonists were expelled from Cochin. On 20 March 1663, Dutch East India Company and the Raja of Cochin signed a treaty under which the company had a monopoly on purchasing on pepper and cinnamon produced in the kingdom. Another treaty in the following year exempted the company from the payment of import taxes. Further treaties eroded the power of the government and turned the kingdom into a puppet state of the company. Bolgatty Palace was built by Dutch traders after the Dutch conquest of Cochin.

Mysorean period 
After the Mysorean invasion of Cochin, the government of Cochin had to pay a one-off tribute of 1 lakh Ikkeri pagodas, and an annual tribute of 30,000 pagodas and four elephants to Mysore.

British period 
Trade in at port increased substantially after the British Empire took control of Cochin. To develop Cochin port, Robert Bristow was brought to Cochin in 1920 by Lord Willingdon, Governor of Madras.

Present period 

In the early 2000s, the city witnessed heavy investment, and experienced a GDP growth rate of 8.3%.

See also

Marine Drive

Notes